Erin Blanchfield (born May 4, 1999) is an American mixed martial artist currently competing in the Flyweight division of the Ultimate Fighting Championship (UFC). She is a former Eddie Bravo Invitational champion. As of March 7, 2023, she is #4 in the UFC women's flyweight rankings, and #9 in the UFC women's pound-for-pound rankings.

Background 
A native of Elmwood Park, New Jersey, Blanchfield started training jiu-jitsu at age of seven and two years later, she started competing in kickboxing and grappling tournaments. By the age of 12, she decided she wanted to be a professional fighter.

Mixed martial arts career

Early career 
Blanchfield fought under Fighting Championships and amassed a record of 1–0 prior to being signed by Invicta Fighting Championships.

Invicta Fighting Championships 

Blanchfield made her Invicta debut on March 17, 2018, against Brittney Cloudy at Invicta FC 30. She won the fight by split decision.

Her next fight came on November 16, 2018, facing Kay Hansen at  Invicta FC 32. She won the fight via majority decision.

On February 15, 2019, Blanchfield faced Tracy Cortez at Invicta FC 34. She lost the fight via split decision.

Blanchfield faced Gabriella Gulfin on June 4, 2019 at Cage Fury Fighting Championships 76. She won the fight via submission in round one.

On February 7, 2020, Blanchfield returned to Invicta, facing Victoria Leonardo at Invicta FC 39. In the second round Blanchfield dropped Leonardo with a head kick, finishing off the technical knockout victory with punches.

Ultimate Fighting Championship

Blanchfield was expected to make her UFC debut as a short notice replacement for Bea Malecki against Norma Dumont on April 10, 2021 at UFC on ABC: Vettori vs. Holland in a Bantamweight bout. In turn, the bout was pulled from the card by after Dumont missed weight by 3.5lbs.

Blanchfield faced  Sarah Alpar on September 18, 2021 at UFC Fight Night: Smith vs. Spann. She won the fight via unanimous decision.

Blanchfield was expected to face Maycee Barber, replacing Montana De La Rosa, on December 11, 2021 at UFC 269. However, Barber withdrew in early November due to undisclosed reasons, and she was replaced by Miranda Maverick. Blanchfield won the fight by unanimous decision. She furthermore set the women’s flyweight single-fight takedown record, with eight total takedowns.

Blanchfield faced JJ Aldrich on June 4, 2022 at UFC Fight Night 207. She won the bout via guillotine choke in the second round.

Blanchfield faced Molly McCann  on November 12, 2022 at UFC 281. She won the fight via a kimura submission in the first round.

Blanchfield was scheduled to face Taila Santos on February 18, 2023 at UFC Fight Night 219. When the main event fight between Cory Sandhagen and Marlon Vera was rescheduled for another event, Blanchfield's fight against Santos was moved up to serve as the main event. Santos dropped out of the bout after her cornermen were denied visas into the United States, and was replaced by Jéssica Andrade. Blanchfield won the fight via submission in round two. This win earned her the Performance of the Night award.

Personal life
Until 2021 Blanchfield was studying Television and Digital Media with a concentration in sports media at Montclair State University, with an aim to becoming a commentator. Blanchfield is the daughter of George and Betsy Blanchfield, and has one brother, Brendan, who is also a mixed martial artist.

Championships and accomplishments

Brazilian jiu-jitsu 
Eddie Bravo Invitational    
Eddie Bravo Invitational Champion (One time)

Mixed martial arts
Ultimate Fighting Championship
Performance of the Night (One time) 
 Tied (Montana De La Rosa) for second most submissions in UFC Women's Flyweight division history (3)

'''Invicta Fighting Championships
Performance of the Night (Two times)  vs. Victoria Leonardo, Brogan Walker-Sanchez

Mixed martial arts record 

|-
|Win
|align=center|11–1
|Jéssica Andrade
|Submission (rear-naked choke)
|UFC Fight Night: Andrade vs. Blanchfield
|
|align=center|2
|align=center|1:37
|Las Vegas, Nevada, United States
|
|-
|Win
|align=center|10–1
|Molly McCann
|Submission (kimura)
|UFC 281
| 
|align=center|1
|align=center|3:37
|New York City, New York, United States
|
|-
|Win
|align=center|9–1
|JJ Aldrich
|Submission (guillotine choke)
|UFC Fight Night: Volkov vs. Rozenstruik
|
|align=center|2
|align=center|2:38
|Las Vegas, Nevada, United States
|
|-
|Win
|align=center|8–1
|Miranda Maverick
|Decision (unanimous)
|UFC 269
|
|align=center|3
|align=center|5:00
|Las Vegas, Nevada, United States
|
|-
|Win
|align=center|7–1
|Sarah Alpar
|Decision (unanimous)
|UFC Fight Night: Smith vs. Spann 
|
|align=center|3
|align=center|5:00
|Las Vegas, Nevada, United States
|
|-
| Win
| align=center|  6–1
| Brogan Walker-Sanchez
| Decision (unanimous)
| Invicta FC 41
| 
| align=center| 3
| align=center| 5:00
| Kansas City, Kansas, United States
|
|-
| Win
| align=center|  5–1
| Victoria Leonardo
| KO (head kick and punches)
| Invicta FC 39
| 
| align=center| 2
| align=center| 2:06
| Kansas City, Kansas, United States
|
|-
| Win
| align=center|  4–1
| Gabriella Gulfin
| Submission (americana)
| Cage Fury FC 76
| 
| align=center| 1
| align=center| 3:20
| Atlantic City, New Jersey, United States
|
|-
| Loss
| align=center|  3–1
| Tracy Cortez
| Decision (split)
| Invicta FC 34
| 
| align=center| 3
| align=center| 5:00
| Kansas City, Missouri, United States
|
|-
| Win
| align=center|3–0
| Kay Hansen
| Decision (majority)
| Invicta FC 32
| 
| align=center| 3
| align=center| 5:00
| Kansas City, Missouri, United States
|
|-
| Win
| align=center| 2–0
| Brittney Cloudy
| Decision (split)
| Invicta FC 30
| 
| align=center| 3
| align=center| 5:00
| Kansas City, Missouri, United States
|
|-
| Win
| align=center| 1–0
| Whittany Pyles
| TKO (doctor stoppage)
| Cage Fury FC 70
| 
| align=center| 1
| align=center| 5:00
| Atlantic City, New Jersey, United States
|
|-

See also
 List of current UFC fighters
 List of female mixed martial artists

Notes

References

External links 
 
 

Living people
1999 births
American female mixed martial artists
Flyweight mixed martial artists
Mixed martial artists utilizing kickboxing
Mixed martial artists utilizing Brazilian jiu-jitsu
American practitioners of Brazilian jiu-jitsu
People awarded a black belt in Brazilian jiu-jitsu
Female Brazilian jiu-jitsu practitioners
Mixed martial artists from New York (state)
21st-century American women
Ultimate Fighting Championship female fighters